Calvin Asa Cooper (August 11, 1922 – July 4, 1994) was a Major League Baseball pitcher. Cooper appeared in one game for the Washington Senators. Prior to his major league debut and exit, he attended and played for Newberry College. Cooper batted and threw right-handed.

Early life
Cooper was born in 1922 in Great Falls, South Carolina, a small town in the north central portion of the state.  As a young man, Cooper served in the US Navy during World War II.   After military service, Cooper attended Newberry College, a small Lutheran college in Newberry, South Carolina.  At age 26, he was  called up from the Triple-A organization of the Washington Senators to play in the majors.

Major League Baseball career 

Cooper made his major league debut on September 14, 1948, with the Washington Senators. His major league career thus consisted of pitching one inning, in which he surrendered five hits, allowing five runs including a home run, and walked a batter, before recording three outs. Being his only appearance, he ended his career with his lifetime earned run average (ERA) of 45.00.

After baseball
After his single afternoon in a major league baseball uniform, Cooper returned to South Carolina where he worked as a personnel director at Clinton Mills in the town of Clinton.  Cooper died on July 4, 1994, in Clinton, South Carolina.  For 28 years prior to his death in 1994, Cooper served as a member of the Laurens County School Board. He is buried at Pinelawn Memory Gardens in Clinton.

Sources 

Newberry Wolves baseball players
Major League Baseball pitchers
Washington Senators (1901–1960) players
Baseball players from South Carolina
1922 births
1994 deaths
People from Chester County, South Carolina
People from Clinton, South Carolina
United States Navy personnel of World War II